The Charles E. Schmidt College of Science is one of the ten academic colleges of Florida Atlantic University in Boca Raton, Florida. The Schmidt College of Science provides undergraduate and graduate education focused on life and physical sciences, as well as urban and regional planning.

Departments
The Charles E. Schmidt College of Science is divided into:
 Biological Sciences
 Chemistry and Biochemistry
 Geosciences
 Mathematical Science
 Physics
 Psychology
 Urban and Regional Planning

References

External links
Charles E. Schmidt College of Science
Florida Atlantic University Official Website

Florida Atlantic University